Birch is a village and civil parish in Essex, England. The village is in the borough of Colchester and in the parliamentary constituency of North Essex. There is a Parish Council.

The parish incorporates the hamlet of Heckfordbridge.

It is only  from Abberton Reservoir.

The parish church of St Peter and St Paul is a Grade II listed building, but has been derelict since it closed in the late 20th century.

According to the 2001 census, Birch had a population of 817, increasing to 873 at the 2011 Census.

Governance
Birch forms part of the electoral ward called Birch and Winstree. The population of this ward at the 2011 Census was 5,651.

References

External links

 Birch Parish Council Web Site
 Birch C of E Aided Primary School, Home Page
 Mainly about the villages of Birch, Layer Breton and Layer Marney near Colchester, Essex
 Birch History and pictures from Mersea Museum

Villages in Essex